Late Again is the nіnth studio album by folk-pop trio, Peter, Paul and Mary and reached #14 on Billboard's Top 200 Albums Chart.

The same week that this album was released, group members Mary Travers and Peter Yarrow were part of an anti-war demonstration in Grant Park during the late August Democratic National Convention in Chicago, IL. The two were among demonstrators who were beaten and teargassed; this made newsreels across the country.

Late Again featured one Billboard Magazine Hot 100 single, "Too Much of Nothing" which was written by Bob Dylan. This album continued the group's transitioning sound, continuing to build a slight "Beatles-influenced" edge into their recordings.

Track listing

Musicians
 Daniel Armstrong - Guitar, Bass
 Robert Banks - Keyboards
 Gene Bertoncini - Guitar
 Maurice Bialkin - Cello
 Elvin Bishop - Guitar
 Richard Bock - Cello
 Monte Dunn - Guitar
 Paul Griffin - Keyboards
 Herbert "Herbie" Hancock - Piano
 Ernest Hayes - Keyboards
 Herb Lovelle - Drums
 Lou Mauro - Bass
 Charlie McCoy - Harmonica
 Charles McCracken - Cello, Violin
 Wayne Moss - Guitar
 Ronald Prokop - Drums
 Bernard Purdie - Drums
 Hargus Robbins - Piano
 Margaret Ross - Harp
 Russ Savakus - Wood Bass
 John Simon - Piano, Arranger
 Marvin Stamm - Trumpet, Cornet
 Luther Tucker : Guitar
 Paul Winter - Saxophone
 Albertine Robinson - Backing Vocals
 Maretha Stewart - Backing Vocals
 Toni Wine - Backing Vocals

Sources
Track listing- PP&M Official Site "Late Again" Page

References

Peter, Paul and Mary albums
1968 albums
Warner Records albums
Pop albums by American artists
Albums produced by Albert Grossman
Albums produced by Milt Okun